Funny Creatures Lane is the second album by the Italian psychedelic rock band Jennifer Gentle, released in 2002.

Track list
 My Memories' Book
 Locoweed
 Wondermarsh
 Mad House
 Oui, c'est moi!
 Floating Fraulein
 Ectoplasmic Garden Party
 The Stammering Ghost
 Ultraviolet Lady Opera
 Lord Hypnosis
 Couple in Bed by a Green Flashing Light
 The Wax-Dolls Parade

Line Up
Marco Fasolo – voice, guitar

Alessio Gastaldello – drums

Isacco Maretto – guitar, accordion

Nicola Crivellari – bass, guitar

References

2002 albums
Jennifer Gentle albums